Taj Khan Karrani (reigned 1564-1565) was the founder of the Karrani dynasty, a Pashtun dynasty of Karlan-Afghan origin that ruled Bengal, Orissa and parts of Bihar.

History
Taj was a former employee of the Pashtun emperor Sher Shah Suri. at the time of anarchy followed the death of Islam Shah Suri, The first step was he now fight against the last Sur emperor, Adil Shah Suri. Adil Shah dispatch Hemu to defeat him in the battle at Chibra-mow or Chhatramau, about 40 Kos from Agra. However Taj managed to escape while seizing Adil's treasury, troops(Halka) of hundred elephants, and he then fled to join with his brothers,'Imad, Sulaiman Khan, and Khwaja I'lyas, who held several district on the banks of Ganges and at Khawaspur Tanda. After this the two armies of Karranis and Adil Shah met on the opposite bank of Ganges despite no engagement occurred for sometime, the force of Hemu was finally triumphant. After this Taj Khan fled to Bengal where he became powerful by exploiting the internecine warfare among his rivals. Next step at some point Taj fled to Bengal along with his brother after Delhi reconquered by Humayun, second Mughal emperor, in Bengal he carefully exploiting the situation of intercine warfares and assassinating Ghiyasuddin Bahadur Shah III before capturing a vast region of south-eastern Bihar and west Bengal. thus founding the Karrani dynasty in Bengal

However Taj died in the same year of his victory. Taj's younger brother, Sulaiman Khan Karrani, succeeded him.

See also
List of rulers of Bengal
History of Bengal
History of West Bengal
History of India
Sur Empire

References

Year of death unknown
Year of birth unknown
Indian people of Pashtun descent
16th-century Indian monarchs
1566 deaths
Karrani dynasty